Gustav Landauer (7 April 1870 – 2 May 1919) was one of the leading theorists on anarchism in Germany at the end of the 19th and the beginning of the 20th century. He was an advocate of social anarchism and an avowed pacifist.

In 1919, he was briefly Commissioner of Enlightenment and Public Instruction of the short-lived Bavarian Soviet Republic during the German Revolution of 1918–1919. He was killed when this republic was overthrown.

Landauer is also known for his study of metaphysics and religion, and his translations of William Shakespeare's works into German.

Life and career 
Landauer was the second child of Jewish parents Rosa  and Herman Landauer. He supported anarchism by the 1890s. In those years, he was especially enthusiastic about the individualistic approach of Max Stirner and Friedrich Nietzsche, but also "cautioned against an apotheosis of the unrestrained individual, potentially leading to the neglect of solidarity".

He was good friends with Martin Buber, influencing the latter's philosophy of dialogue. Landauer believed that social change could not be achieved solely through control of the state or economic apparatus, but required a revolution in interpersonal relations.

He felt that true socialism could arise only in conjunction with this social change, and he wrote, "The community we long for and need, we will find only if we sever ourselves from individuated existence; thus we will at last find, in the innermost core or our hidden being, the most ancient and most universal community: the human race and the cosmos."

One of Landauer's grandchildren, with wife and author Hedwig Lachmann, was Mike Nichols, the American television, stage and film director, writer, and producer.

See also
 List of peace activists

Works 

 Skepsis und Mystik (1903)
 Die Revolution (trans. Revolution) (1907)
 Aufruf zum Sozialismus (1911) (trans. by David J. Parent as For Socialism. Telos Press, 1978. )
 Editor of the journal Der Sozialist (trans. The Socialist) from 1893–1899
 "Anarchism in Germany" (1895), "Weak Statesmen, Weaker People" (1910) and "Stand Up Socialist" (1915) are excerpted in Anarchism: A Documentary History of Libertarian Ideas – Volume One: From Anarchy to Anarchism (300 CE–1939), ed. Robert Graham. Black Rose Books, 2005. 
 Gustav Landauer. Gesammelte Schriften Essays Und Reden Zu Literatur, Philosophie, Judentum. (translated title: Collected Writings Essays and Speeches of Literature, Philosophy and Judaica). (Wiley-VCH, 1996) 
 Gustav Landauer. Anarchism in Germany and Other Essays. eds. Stephen Bender and Gabriel Kuhn. Barbary Coast Collective.
 Gustav Landauer. Revolution and Other Writings: A Political Reader, ed. & trans. Gabriel Kuhn; PM Press, 2010.

References

Footnotes

Further reading 

 
 
 Thomas Esper. The Anarchism of Gustav Landauer. (Chicago: University of Chicago Press, 1961)
 Ruth Link-Salinger Hyman. Gustav Landauer: Philosopher of Utopia. (Hackett Publishing Company, 1977). 
 Eugene Lunn. Prophet of Community: The Romantic Socialism of Gustav Landauer. (Charles H. Kerr Publishing Company, 1973). 
 Charles B. Maurer. Call to Revolution: The Mystical Anarchism of Gustav Landauer. (Wayne State University Press, 1971). 
 Michael Löwy, Redemption & Utopia: Jewish Libertarian Thought in Central Europe, a Study in Elective Affinity. Translated by Hope Heaney. Stanford University Press, 1992.
 Martin Buber. Paths in Utopia. London: Routledge & Kegan Paul, 1949.

External links 

 
 
 
 
 
 German Tragedies: Robert Nichols Remembers

1870 births
1919 deaths
19th-century German Jews
Anarchist theorists
Anarcho-communists
Anarcho-pacifists
Bavarian Soviet Republic
Critics of religions
German anarchists
German Peace Society members
Jewish anarchists
Jewish pacifists
Libertarian socialists
Murdered anarchists
People from the Grand Duchy of Baden
Writers from Karlsruhe